Jürgen Henze (born 23 June 1950 in Schkopau) is a former East German slalom canoeist who competed in the 1970s.

He won a gold medal in the C2 team event at the 1975 in Skopje. Henze also finished 18th in the C2 event at the 1972 Summer Olympics in Munich.

His partner in the boat was Herbert Fischer.

His two sons Frank and Stefan were also slalom canoeists. Both represented reunified Germany in the Olympics unlike their father who only competed for the now dissolved East Germany. Stefan was a silver medalist from the C2 event at the 2004 Summer Olympics in Athens.

References

1950 births
Living people
People from Saalekreis
German male canoeists
Sportspeople from Saxony-Anhalt
Olympic canoeists of East Germany
Canoeists at the 1972 Summer Olympics
Medalists at the ICF Canoe Slalom World Championships